KUVO (89.3 MHz) is a non-profit FM radio station broadcasting mainly jazz music in a public radio format. Licensed to Denver, Colorado, KUVO is owned by the Rocky Mountain Public Media Inc. KUVO's mission is to "provide distinctive music, news and informational programming reflecting the values and cultural diversity of their listener community."

History
In the 1980s Hugo Morales, a radio station executive sought to establish a Hispanic radio station in the Denver area as part of his organization Radio Bilingüe. Florence Hernández-Ramos (born 1950), a graduate of Lamar High School and the University of Colorado at Boulder, helped establish the station. Hernández-Ramos had attended the Colorado School of Law to follow her passion for civil rights. She met Morales while working as a paralegal in the Colorado attorney general's office in 1982. Given her law background in civil rights and interest in increasing Hispanic representation, Hernández-Ramos was drawn into Morales’ cause. She conducted research on how such a station could be put on the air and secured the grants necessary to fund it. She also arranged the purchase of the broadcasting and recording equipment, getting the board of directors, and establishing an orientation and training program.

On August 29, 1985, KUVO first signed on. As of its first airing, it was owned and operated by Denver Educational Broadcasting.  Since 1994, The station has been broadcasting from the Five Points Media Center at 2900 Welton Street in the Five Points neighborhood of Denver. While it is best known for its jazz format, KUVO remains a Hispanic controlled station and ensures that news, public service announcements, and accomplishments of Hispanic and other local minority communities are shared on air.

On January 16, 2013, it was announced that KUVO would merge into PBS member network Rocky Mountain PBS.

In 2019, KUVO signed a 10-year LMA with the Open Media Foundation to launch Denver Open Media on KUVO-HD3. This partnership includes broadcast of the HD3 signal on K225BS (92.9 FM), an FM translator owned by OMF. Denver Open Media is Denver's first all-local station featuring music and shows exclusively from artists in the Denver Metro region.

Programming
The station's local programming consists primarily of jazz, blues, and Latin jazz music, but it also includes programs devoted to other musical genres such as acid jazz, funk, gospel, rhythm and blues, and salsa. The station also carries selected NPR and other syndicated programs such as: Jazz Night In America, hosted by Christian McBride and WFMT's Jazz Network. The station has its own performance studio and on occasion broadcasts live performances and interviews by local and national recording artists.

KUVO broadcasts to 89,200 listeners in the Denver Metro Area each week. After the launch of their mobile app on June 10, 2013, KUVO gained a worldwide listener community. In addition to their local audience, KUVO draws an additional 19,900 listeners from outside the metro area.

KUVO, which commonly refers to itself on-air as "The Oasis in the City," won the "Major Market Jazz Station of the Year" award in 2005 and 2006 from JazzWeek magazine.

Community engagement
Since its inception, KUVO has emphasized local partnerships and investing in its community.

KUVO is one of the only radio stations to have its own performance studio. In 2007, they received a grant from Dr. Robert Greer, in memorial of his wife Phyllis A. Greer, to expand the studio into its current iteration. It accommodates an audience of 30 people. Here they host local artists for small live shows, broadcasting on the station, or recording for later distribution. KUVO also partners with high school and collegiate bands and after-school jazz programs throughout the year, giving students a chance to put on shows in front of an audience in the Phyllis A. Greer Performance Studio. Over 3,000 students have performed in the studio.

KUVO also has an ongoing partnership with Dazzle, an independent jazz venue in Denver. Here they host performances for a larger audience.

Funding
As a public radio station, KUVO relies on donations for funding and does not broadcast advertising. 63% of the station's income comes from individual member pledges and donations. In February 2018, they had more than 7,400 supporting members.

See also
 List of jazz radio stations in the United States

References

External links

Dazzle
Tune-in KUVO

UVO
Jazz radio stations in the United States
Albany County, Wyoming
Summit County, Colorado
NPR member stations
Five Points, Denver
Radio stations established in 1985
1985 establishments in Colorado